Ralston Creek is a tributary of Clear Creek, approximately  long, in central Colorado in the United States. It drains a suburban and urban area of the northwestern Denver Metropolitan Area. It rises in the foothills in northeastern Gilpin County, in southern Golden Gate Canyon State Park. It descends through a valley eastward into Jefferson, following Drew Hill Road (County Road 57), emerging from the mountains approximately 3 miles (5 km) north of Golden, where it is impounded to form Ralston Reservoir and Arvada/Blunn Reservoir on both sides of State Highway 93. It flows eastward through Arvada and joins Clear Creek from the north in southeast Arvada, near the intersection of Sheridan Avenue and Interstate 76.

History
The first documented discovery of gold in the Rocky Mountain region occurred in June 1850, when Lewis Ralston, a Georgia prospector headed for the California gold fields, dipped his sluice pan into this stream near its mouth at Clear Creek.  Ralston found about 1/4 ounce (6 g) of gold worth about five dollars.  Ralston's companions named the stream Ralston's Creek in his honor, but they all left the next morning, drawn by the lure of the California gold fields.

In the spring of 1858, William Green Russell and his brothers searched the creek for gold.  Later in the year, Lewis Ralston brought another group of prospectors back to the site of his first discovery.

In 2010 officials discovered that the defunct Schwartzwalder uranium mine was contaminating groundwater near the reservoir, threatening the Denver water supply with concentrations of uranium some 1000 times the human health standard. The owners of the mine, Cotter Corp., rerouted the Ralston Creek around the mine site after uranium levels of between 40 and 50 parts per billion were discovered in the creek, greater than the 30 ppb federal drinking water standard. Cotter hopes the rerouting will be temporary while it cleans the contaminated mine using bioremediation.

See also
List of rivers of Colorado

References

Colorado Mining Boom
Rivers of Colorado
Rivers of Gilpin County, Colorado
Rivers of Jefferson County, Colorado
Arvada, Colorado
Tributaries of the Platte River